Breckenridge, Illinois may refer to the following places in Illinois:
Breckenridge, Hancock County, Illinois
Breckenridge, Sangamon County, Illinois